Beach volleyball competitions at the 2022 South American Games in Asuncion, Paraguay were held between October 11 and 15, 2022 at Los Pynandi World Cup Stadium.

Medal summary

Medal table

Medalists

Participating nations

Men's tournament

Women's tournament

References

2022 South American Games events
South American Games
2022
2022 South American Games